The Spirit of Stanford is a 1942 American drama film directed by Charles Barton and written by Howard J. Green, William Brent and Nick Lukats. The film stars Frankie Albert, Marguerite Chapman, Matt Willis, Shirley Patterson, Kay Harris and Robert Kellard. The film was released on October 8, 1942, by Columbia Pictures.

Plot

Cast           
Frankie Albert as Frankie Albert
Marguerite Chapman as Fay Edwards
Matt Willis as Link Wyman
Shirley Patterson as June Rogers
Kay Harris as Edna
Robert Kellard as Cliff Bonnard 
Ernie Nevers as Ernie Nevers

References

External links
 

1942 films
1940s biographical drama films
American biographical drama films
American black-and-white films
American football films
Biographical films about sportspeople
Columbia Pictures films
Cultural depictions of players of American football
1940s English-language films
Films directed by Charles Barton
Stanford Cardinal football
1942 drama films
1940s American films